NGC 4489 is a dwarf elliptical galaxy located about 60 million light-years away in the constellation of Coma Berenices. It was discovered by astronomer William Herschel on March 21, 1784. NGC 4489 is a member of the Virgo Cluster.

See also 
 List of NGC objects (4001–5000)
 Messier 32
 NGC 4458
 NGC 4406

References

External links 

Dwarf elliptical galaxies
Coma Berenices
4489
Virgo Cluster
41365
7655
Astronomical objects discovered in 1784